Mooi Juultje van Volendam  is a 1924 Dutch silent film directed by Alex Benno.

Cast
 Annie Bos - Juultje
 August Van den Hoeck - Barendse
 Remi Rasquin - Meesen
 Jan Kiveron - Sander
 Pierre Balledux - Piet
 Frans Boogaers - Rekveld
 Jetje Cabanier - (as Henriette Cabanier)
 Johan Elsensohn - Toon
 Piet Fuchs - Meesens boekhouder
 Annie Metman-Slinger
 Arthur Sprenger - Meesens boekhouder
 Willem van der Veer - Willem
 Marie Verstraete - Trees Barendse

External links 
 

1924 films
Dutch silent feature films
Dutch black-and-white films
Films directed by Alex Benno